Beverly Naya (born Beverly Ifunaya Bassey; 17 April 1989) is a British-born Nigerian actress. Beverly won Most Promising Talent at the 2010 Best of Nollywood Awards. She also won the award for Fast Rising Actress at the 2011 City People Entertainment Awards.

Early life
Beverly Ifunaya Bassey was born in London as the only child of her Nigerian parents. At 17, Beverly began acting while studying philosophy, psychology, and sociology at Brunel University. She also studied script-writing and film-making at Roehampton University. In an interview with BellaNaija, she explained that she relocated to Nigeria because of the rapid growth of Nollywood, and the opportunities that it creates for aspiring actors. In another interview, Beverly cited Ramsey Nouah and Genevieve Nnaji as mentors.

Career 
Naya began acting at the age of 17 and studied film-making at Roehampton University, London. In the year 2011, Naya was named the "fastest rising actress" in the City People Entertainment Awards in Nigeria, when asked why she returned to Nigeria by Encomium Magazine she said:

After I graduated from university, I just knew that I wanted to act, I knew I wanted to act, and in London I could shoot a film probably once in a year and that's it.  Whereas coming to this industry, I can build a brand as well as shoot films more often and be given a more diverse amount of scripts.  So, I decided to come back for that reason.

Filmography
 Guilty Pleasures (2009)
 Death Waters (2012)
Tinsel
Home in Exile
Alan Poza
Forgetting June
Make a move
Up Creek Without a Paddle
Stripped
Weekend Getaway
...When Love Happens (2014)
Brother's Keeper (2014)
Before 30 (2015–)
Oasis (2015)
Skinny Girl in Transit (2015)
Suru L'ere (2016)
The Wedding Party (2016)
The Wedding Party 2 (2017)
Chief Daddy (2018)
Dinner
Affairs of the Heart
Jumbled
The Arbitration
Dibia
In Sickness and Health
Nneka the Pretty Serpent (2020)
Two Weeks in Lagos (2021)
The Eve (2018 film)
Chief Daddy 2: Going for Broke (2022)

Awards and nominations

References

External links

British expatriate actresses in Nigeria
Living people
21st-century British actresses
1988 births
Nigerian film actresses
21st-century Nigerian actresses
British emigrants to Nigeria
Nigerian film award winners
Alumni of the University of Roehampton
Alumni of Brunel University London